Flavius Ioan Șomfălean (born 13 December 1973) is a Romanian former football defender. After he ended his playing career he worked for a while as Cristian Pustai's assistant coach at several clubs. In 2019 he started his career as a head coach at CSM Târgu Mureș.

Honours
Gaz Metan Mediaș
Divizia B: 1999–00

References

1973 births
Living people
Romanian footballers
Association football defenders
Liga I players
Liga II players
ASA Târgu Mureș (1962) players
CS Gaz Metan Mediaș players
Romanian football managers
Sportspeople from Târgu Mureș